Victor Earl Schwenk (October 26, 1924 – March 14, 2016) was an American gridiron football coach and executive. He served as the head football at Occidental College in Los Angeles from  1960 to 1963, compiling a record of 23–12. Schwenk was the general manager for the Edmonton Eskimos of the Canadian Football League (CFL) in 1966 and the New Orleans Saints of the National Football League (NFL) from 1968 to 1972. He died in 2016.

Head coaching record

College

References

1924 births
2016 deaths
American football ends
Edmonton Elks general managers
Los Angeles Rams coaches
National Football League general managers
New Orleans Saints executives
Occidental Tigers football coaches
Occidental Tigers football players
High school football coaches in California
Sportspeople from Los Angeles
Players of American football from Los Angeles
Players of Canadian football from Los Angeles
Players of American football from Dayton, Ohio
Players of Canadian football from Dayton, Ohio
Sports coaches from Los Angeles